The Pathologies is a 2005 novel by the Russian writer Zakhar Prilepin. The Pathologies is a story about Chechen War.

This novel was published in 2005 in Andreevskiy Flag (Russia).

References

External links
 The Pathologies
 Zahar Prilepin - official website

Novels by Zakhar Prilepin
2005 novels
21st-century Russian novels
War novels
Chechen–Russian conflict